Kieran Buchanan (born 26 January 1999) is a  international rugby league footballer who plays as a er or  for the Batley Bulldogs in the Betfred Championship.

He has previously played for Hull F.C. in the Betfred Super League and spent time on loan from Hull at Doncaster in Betfred League 1.

Background
Buchanan was born in Kingston upon Hull, East Riding of Yorkshire, England. He is of Scottish descent.

Career

Hull FC
In 2019 he made his Super League début for Hull F.C. against the Catalans Dragons.

Batley Bulldogs
On 11 September 2020 it was announced that Buchanan would join the Batley Bulldogs for the 2021 season.

International

References

External links

Hull FC profile
SL profile
Scotland profile
Scotland RL profile

1998 births
Living people
Batley Bulldogs players
Doncaster R.L.F.C. players
English rugby league players
Hull F.C. players
Rugby league centres
Rugby league players from Kingston upon Hull
Scotland national rugby league team players